The women's combined classification competition of the 2015 Winter Universiade was held at Universiade slope, Sierra Nevada, Spain on February 13, 2015.

Results

Women's combined classification